Čertova dolina is a nature reserve in the Slovak municipality of Tisovec in the Rimavská Sobota District. The nature reserve covers an area of 49 ha. It has a protection level of 5 under the Slovak nature protection system. The nature reserve is part of the Muránska planina National Park.

Description
The Čertova dolina nature reserve protects preserved forest communities with fir, spruce, beech, and other deciduous trees on a limestone substrate. The area has a distinct karst relief including the large Čertová jaskyňa cave system and a gorge section of the Čertova stream with waterfalls.

References

Geography of Banská Bystrica Region
Protected areas of Slovakia